"Es De Verdad" (English: "It's For Real/It's The Truth"), is the first official single from Belinda's re-release album "Utopía²".

Information 
It was released as the fourth single in the U.S. after the release of "Luz Sin Gravedad". The song was written by Reyli, Karen Juantorena and Diego González, and produced by Armando Ávila. The song didn't receive a music video.

Track list 
Digital Download
 Es De Verdad

Charts 
The song debuted at number forty-eight on the Hot Latin Songs chart, and peaked at number forty-one on that chart. Also debuted at number twenty-five on the Latin Pop Airplay chart, and peaked at number eighteen on that chart.

References 

2007 singles
Belinda Peregrín songs
2007 songs
Songs written by Reyli
EMI Televisa Music singles
Song recordings produced by Armando Ávila